Mercury is both a surname and a given name. Notable people with the name include:

Surname
Daniela Mercury, Brazilian singer
Eric Mercury, Canadian singer
Freddie Mercury, singer of the rock group Queen
Joey Mercury or Adam Birch, professional wrestler

Given name
Mercury Hayes (born 1973), former professional American football wide receiver
Mercury Morris (born 1947), former American football player